A bar council or bar association, in a common law jurisdiction with a legal profession split between solicitors and barristers or advocates, is a professional body that regulates the profession of barristers. In such jurisdictions, solicitors are generally regulated by the law society.

In common law jurisdictions with no distinction between barristers and solicitors (i.e. where there is a "fused profession"), the professional body may be called variously a Law Society, Bar Council or a bar association.

List of some bar councils and bar associations
The following are bar councils and bar associations that are professional bodies for barristers in common law jurisdictions with a split legal profession.
 General Council of the Bar, the professional body for England and Wales commonly known as the Bar Council
 Bar Council of Northern Ireland, in Northern Ireland
 Australian Bar Association, in Australia
Australian Capital Territory Bar Association, in the Australian Capital Territory
 New South Wales Bar Association, in New South Wales
 Victorian Bar Council, in Victoria
 Queensland Bar Association, in Queensland
 South Australian Bar Association, in South Australia
 Western Australian Bar Association, in Western Australia
 Tasmanian Bar Council, in Tasmania
 Bangladesh Bar Council
 Bar Council of Ireland (together with the King's Inns), in the Republic of Ireland
 Pakistan Bar Council, the statutory body that regulates the legal profession in Pakistan
 Sindh Bar Council, in Sindh
 Punjab Bar Council, in Punjab
 Balochistan Bar Council, in Balochistan
 Khyber Pakhtunkhwa Bar Council, in Khyber Pakhtunkhwa
 Azad Jammu & Kashmir Bar Council, in Azad Jammu & Kashmir
 Islamabad Bar Council, in Islamabad

 The Legal Practice Council, the regulatory body in South Africa that regulates the activities of all lawyers in South Africa 
 The General Council of the Bar of South Africa, the body to which most regional bar associations in South Africa belong
 The Johannesburg Society of Advocates, the largest bar association in Johannesburg, South Africa

 Hong Kong Bar Association, in Hong Kong

Bar associations
Legal organizations
Regulators of barristers and advocates